A barouche is a large, open, four-wheeled carriage, both heavy and luxurious, drawn by two horses. It was fashionable throughout the 19th century. Its body provides seats for four passengers, two back-seat passengers vis-à-vis two behind the coachman's high box-seat. A leather roof can be raised to give back-seat passengers some protection from the weather.

Etymology

Barouche is an anglicisation of the German word barutsche, via the Italian baroccio or biroccio and ultimately from the ancient Roman Empire's Latin birotus, "two-wheeled". The name thus became a misnomer, as the later form of the carriage had four wheels.

Development and variations

The barouche was based on an earlier style of carriage, the calash or calèche: this was a light carriage with small wheels, inside seats for four passengers, a separate driver's seat and a folding top. A folding calash top was a feature of two other types: the chaise, a two-wheeled carriage for one or two persons, a body hung on leather straps or thorough-braces, usually drawn by one horse; and a victoria, a low four-wheeled pleasure carriage for two with a raised seat in front for the driver.  A victoria is distinguished from a barouche by having fold-down occasional seating for the rear-facing passengers, instead of permanent seats in that position.

Description of the barouche carriage

A barouche was an expensive four-wheeled, shallow vehicle used in the 19th century with two double seats inside, arranged vis-à-vis, so that the sitters on the front seat face those on the back seat. It has a soft collapsible half-hood folding like a bellows over the back seat and a high outside box seat in front for the driver. The entire carriage is suspended on C springs and leather straps and more recently additional elliptical springs.

It is drawn by a pair of horses and was used in the 19th century for display and summer leisure driving. Designed to give a powerful impression of luxury and elegance, the structure of the carriage is heavier than it looks because of the lack of a rigid roof structure.

A light barouche was a barouchet or barouchette. A barouche-sociable was described as a cross between a barouche and a victoria. 

A barouche-landau is mentioned in Emma, published in 1816 by Jane Austen. It "combines the best features of a barouche and a landau". An illustration of the expensive and more rarely seen vehicle, on account of the expense, is shown in a paper by Ed Ratcliffe, citing editor R. W. Chapman's collection of the works of Jane Austen, in the volume Minor Works, as noted in Ratcliffe's sources.

In popular culture
In the novels by Jane Austen, "Lady Dalrymple, Mr. and Mrs. Palmer, and Henry Crawford owned barouches" in which other characters rode, and Jane Austen herself on at least one occasion in 1813 rode in a barouche. Henry Crawford was a character in Mansfield Park and his barouche was the topic of two important scenes of the novel; Lady Dalrymple was in Persuasion, while Mr and Mrs Palmer were characters in Sense and Sensibility.

Barouche driving is mentioned as a fashionable pastime in Nice, Italy, in chapter 37 of Little Women by Louisa May Alcott.

Chichikov, the main character of Nikolai Gogol's "Dead Souls", is frequently driven around in his own barouche by his servant Selifan and is also involved in a crash with another carriage.

Gallery

See also 
 Steering undercarriage
 Types of horse-drawn carriages

References

External links

Carriages
Animal-powered vehicles
History of road transport
Horse transportation